Josep Antoni Duran i Lleida (born 27 March 1952 in Alcampell, Spain) is a Spanish politician. A qualified lawyer, Duran began his political career when he was elected MP in the General Elections of Spain in 1979, representing Lleida becoming tinent d'alcalde in the municipality of Lleida.

Currently Duran is an MP for Barcelona district, elected in the General Elections in 2004, and is a member of Convergence and Union (CiU). Duran i Lleida has also been the president of Democratic Union of Catalonia (UDC), a political party which is part of CiU, since 1987 and also from 1982 to 1984.

Comments

In November 2003 Duran i Lleida advocated calling gay marriage (which is legal in Spain) by a different name. In January 2007 Josep Antoni adopted the Gibraltar nationality as a stand against the Spanish government policies. Years after, in March 2012 during a fierce debate with Spanish prime minister Mariano Rajoy, Duran i Lleida asked for the immediate recognition of Kosovo by Spain, and stated that the reasons for non-recognition "are not international but internal".

References

External links
Josep Antoni Duran i Lleida 

1952 births
Commanders of the Order of Merit of the Republic of Poland
Convergence and Union politicians
Democratic Union of Catalonia politicians
Interior ministers of Catalonia
Leaders of political parties in Spain
Living people
Members of the 2nd Congress of Deputies (Spain)
Members of the 3rd Congress of Deputies (Spain)
Members of the 4th Congress of Deputies (Spain)
Members of the 8th Congress of Deputies (Spain)
Members of the 9th Congress of Deputies (Spain)
MEPs for Spain 1986–1987
People from La Litera